Joel Ashley Edwards (born November 22, 1961) is an American professional golfer.

Edwards was born in Dallas, Texas. He attended North Texas State University and turned professional in 1984.

Edwards has played on both the PGA Tour and the Nationwide Tour. He has won once on each tour: the 2001 Air Canada Championship and the 1999 Nike Mississippi Gulf Coast Open. He lost his PGA Tour card in 2004 and competed on the Nationwide Tour through 2007.

Edwards played occasionally on the Nationwide Tour from 2009 to 2011 before being eligible for the Champions Tour in 2012.

Professional wins (3)

PGA Tour wins (1)

Nike Tour wins (1)

Other wins (1)
1988 North Dakota Open

Results in major championships

Note: Edwards never played in the Masters Tournament nor The Open Championship.

CUT = missed the half-way cut
"T" = tied

Results in The Players Championship

CUT = missed the halfway cut
DQ = disqualified
"T" indicates a tie for a place

Results in World Golf Championships

"T" = Tied

See also
1988 PGA Tour Qualifying School graduates
1989 PGA Tour Qualifying School graduates
1990 PGA Tour Qualifying School graduates
1995 PGA Tour Qualifying School graduates
1999 Nike Tour graduates

References

External links

American male golfers
PGA Tour golfers
PGA Tour Champions golfers
Korn Ferry Tour graduates
Golfers from Dallas
People from Coppell, Texas
1961 births
Living people